Lincoln Township is a township in Crawford County, Kansas, in the United States.  As of the 2010 census, its population was 832.

Geography
According to the United States Geological Survey, it contains six cemeteries: Brown, Englevale, Fowler, McGonigle, Old Arcadia and Pleasant Valley Sheffield.

The streams of Bone Creek, Dry Branch and Richland Creek run through this township.

References

 USGS Geographic Names Information System (GNIS)

External links
 City-Data.com

Townships in Crawford County, Kansas
Townships in Kansas